Howard Samuels may refer to:

 Howard C. Samuels (born 1952), American clinical psychologist
 Howard J. Samuels (1919–1984), American statesman, industrialist, civil rights activist and philanthropist
 Howard Samuels (actor), in The Nativity